The following is a list of episodes for the sitcom Step by Step. It premiered on September 20, 1991, on ABC, then moving to CBS ending on June 26, 1998. A total of 160 episodes, spanning seven seasons, were produced.

Series overview

Episodes

Season 1 (1991–92)

Season 2 (1992–93)

Season 3 (1993–94)

Season 4 (1994–95)

Season 5 (1995–96)

Season 6 (1997)

Season 7 (1997–98)

Lists of American sitcom episodes

it:Una bionda per papà#Episodi